Joe Tabbanella is an American actor who played Stevens on the MyNetworkTV limited-run serial Saints & Sinners. He also played Marco Manetti on another MyNetworkTV telenovela, Desire. Tabbanella's other credits include The Young and the Restless, NCIS and Melrose Place.

Filmography

Films 
 2009 Under New Management as Lilo Conforte
 2009 What's True as Det. Giani Del Rio
 2007 Made in Brooklyn as James
 2007 Fetch as Jimmy
 2005 Survival of the Fittest as Benny Graziano
 2003 April's Shower as Jake
 2002 Feedback as Lenny
 1998 Highland Park Blues as John
 1997 My F-ing Job as Tony
 1996 Electra as Billy Duncan

Television 
 2007 Saints & Sinners as Stevens
 2006 Desire as Marco Manetti
 2006 The Young and the Restless as Thad Warner
 2004 NCIS as Ricky Napolitano
 1997 Melrose Place as Tailor
 1997 Women: Stories of Passion as O Palhaço

External links

American male television actors
Living people
Year of birth missing (living people)